Love Blossoms (pronounced as Xin Hua Duo Duo Kai ) was the long-running drama produced by Singapore's free-to-air channel, MediaCorp TV Channel 8. Part 1 was aired from 28 May 2008 to 15 August 2008, and consisted of 58 episodes. It is shown on weekdays at 7pm. Part 2, consisting of 55 episodes, was aired from 2 December 2008 to 9 February 2009. It is now repeats its telecast on Tuesdays - Saturdays at 5am after Your Hand In Mine

Cast

Tao Family

Yun Family

Music

Synopsis

Guilt of the Father
Widower Tao Dashun (Chen Shucheng) runs a floral nursery business Tao Garden . He has four daughters; however, he is not expressive with his affections and his daughters become very distant from him as they grow up.

Dashun has been estranged from his eldest daughter Linglan (Constance Song) ever since he personally sent her to a drug rehabilitation centre when she was 18. The rebellious Linglan did not return home after her release. She gave birth to a daughter, Yiling (Chen Chuxuan), and after her boyfriend abandoned her, both began living with a bookie, Lu Gua (Chen Tianwen), who often looks for opportunities to violate Yiling.

Yiling becomes good friends with Dashun by coincidence and through this Linglan is reunited with her father. Linglan is indifferent to Dashun's good intentions to make things up to her. Lu Gua on the other hand takes advantage of Dashun's guilt to reap benefits out of him.

Gambling woes
Dashun's second daughter Zijing (Ivy Lee) is married to a flower vendor, Yun Kaiwang (Zheng Geping), and they have a daughter, Feifei (Grace Ng). Due to financial constraints, she has decided not to try for a son – a decision that places her at odds with her mother-in-law Su Baozuan (Jin Yinji). Kaiwang's sister Caixia (Patricia Mok) moves back home with her husband Kang Qingxiong (Rayson Tan) when his business fails and he goes bankrupt. As Caixia is not on cordial terms with Zijing, this further fuels the existing bad blood with her mother-in-law.

Qingxiong instigates Kaiwang to get a second wife overseas to bear him a son. Kaiwang is tempted and his indecisiveness causes Zijing to leaves home. While trying to win her back, Kaiwang discovers that she is an incorrigible gambler and even owes huge debts to loan-sharks. In a fit of anger, Kaiwang suggests a divorce and insisted that she quit her habit before reuniting with him.

The cheats and the cheatings
Qingxiong's second wife Ruan Erbo (Priscelia Chan) arrives from Vietnam to look for him. He forces Kaiwang to be his scapegoat and the latter reluctantly agrees to protect his sister's marriage. However, Erbo falls in love with Kaiwang and Zijing misunderstands that Kaiwang has really taken a second wife. She goes to Malacca to nurse her bruised feelings. Kaiwang follows in pursuit and an opportunity to reunite is interrupted by an accident which leaves Zijing unconscious. Thinking that Zijing has given up on him for good, Kaiwang returns to Singapore.

Qingxiong uses Kaiwang's name to operate a matchmaking agency. With that as a front, Qingxiong encourages his clients to source for second wives overseas and even organizes lustful escapades for his male clients. Kaiwang, too distracted and depressed with his family problems, leaves the business in Qingxiong's care. Unbeknownst to him, what Qingxiong is doing is actually a ticking time bomb waiting to explode…

Flower Nursery Fight
Dashun's third daughter Haitong ( Felicia Chin ) is an aggressively enterprising and achievement-oriented young woman who runs a hamper cum floral business with her boyfriend, Guo Zipeng (Adam Chen).

Dashun sells his nursery to an American-born Chinese man, Ma Daji (Zhang Yaodong), to clear Zijing's gambling debts. Knowing nothing about nursery operation, he is manipulated by Haitong into signing a contract which not only provides flowers to her company at a low price but also hires Dashun at an exorbitant salary. Daji is helpless when he realizes that he has been taken advantage of.

When Haitong discovers that Zipeng is two-timing her, she gives up the relationship and business to return to the nursery. Her determination and enthusiasm change Daji's perception of her. As the nursery's business grows under their cooperation, so do their affections for each other. Daji's parents decide to venture into the China market and suggest that he sell off the nursery to join them in their business. Daji hopes that Haitong would ask him to stay, but she does not want to use their relationship to tie Daji down. Dejected, Daji leaves for China.

Self-referencing of Mediacorp
Dashun's youngest daughter Wenzhu (Koh Yah Hwee) is an undergraduate with countless suitors, but she only has eyes for Daji. Talent-scouted by the television station to act in a drama, she inadvertently offends a popular actress, Xu Yanning (May Phua), who makes things difficult for her. Wenzhu's conflict with Yanning and her close friendship with image consultant Wang Zhigang (Ben Yeo) become a talking point for the media. Worried that her public image will be affected, Wenzhu distants herself from Zhigang, unaware that he has already fallen in love with her. When the media brands him as a sissy and even gay, Wenzhu breaks off their friendship for the sake of her career.

Dashun realizes he also has a son, Wenhao (Terence Cao), from his affair with Liang Miaochang (Hong Huifang) 20 years ago. Miaochang eventually married Yu Dongcheng (Huang Wenyong) and lied that Wenhao is her foster son. Both have a daughter, Meiwei (Eelyn Kok). Unhappy with her marriage, Miaochang furthers her studies overseas, leaving Wenhao and Meiwei in Dongcheng's care. When Miaochang returns and realizes that Wenhao has not been well taken care of by Dongcheng, she decides to acknowledge Wenhao and bring him back to Australia.

Lu Gua's henchmen come to seek revenge on Wenhao, injuring Wenzhu accidentally. The injury leaves her with a clot in her brain which causes her severe headaches and affecting her acting career greatly. The once-cheerful girl retreats into seclusion.

The path ahead
Miaochang is killed in a road accident and her death throws Wenhao into a stage of despair. Dashun could not bear to see his son like that and decides to come clean about his relationship with him. He announces his decision to acknowledge Wenhao and his intention to take care of Linglan's family. Dashun believes that the family reunion will be a new beginning but little does he realise that Wenhao and the vindictive Linglan's return will pose unimaginable challenges to his life and to Tao Garden...

(To be continued in Season 2)

(Source: Channel 8 official website)

Production 
Part 1 was initially scheduled to consist of 55 episodes, but it was extended to 58 episodes so as to fill the week up.

Awards & Nominations
The series was nominated for 2 Categories.

Star Awards 2009

See also
List of programmes broadcast by Mediacorp Channel 8
Love Blossoms II

References

Singapore Chinese dramas
2008 Chinese television series endings
2008 Singaporean television series debuts
2008 Singaporean television series endings
Mandarin-language television shows
Channel 8 (Singapore) original programming